Marie, Dancing Still is a musical with music by Stephen Flaherty and book and lyrics by Lynn Ahrens, based on Edgar Degas' 1880 statue Little Dancer of Fourteen Years. The musical, then named Little Dancer, premiered at the Kennedy Center in Washington, D.C. in 2014. The original production was directed and choreographed by Susan Stroman.

The musical was retitled Marie, Dancing Still – A New Musical in 2018, prior to the production opening at the 5th Avenue Theatre, Seattle in March 2019.

Production history
The musical premiered at the Kennedy Center's Eisenhower Theatre on October 25, 2014. The production closed on November 30, 2014.

The writing team passed on a potential Los Angeles run in 2015 in order to do rewrites and revisions on the piece. The invitation - only March 28, 2016 industry reading featured a newly revised draft of the show. Participants included a number of cast members from the original Kennedy Center production, including New York City Ballet principal dancer Tiler Peck, Rebecca Luker, Karen Ziemba, Kyle Harris and Michael X. Martin.

A private reading was held in June 2018. The reading featured Tiler Peck, Robert Lindsay, Kate Baldwin and Karen Ziemba. The musical was retitled Marie, A New Musical in 2018, and then Marie, Dancing Still. This is based on the "developmental work done by the creators to focus on the once “unknown” woman at the heart of the story." The musical opened at the 5th Avenue Theatre, Seattle on March 22, 2019 and will run to April 14. The cast for the 5th Avenue Theatre production includes Tiler Peck (Marie), Terrence Mann (Degas), Louise Pitre (Adult Marie), Dee Hoty (Mary Cassat) and Karen Ziemba (Martine Van Goethem), with direction and choreography by Stroman.

Synopsis
The musical is inspired by the story of Marie van Goethem, a young ballerina who posed for Edgar Degas. Marie became, inadvertently, the most famous dancer in the world. Torn by her family's poverty, her debt to the artist, and the lure of wealthy men, she struggles to keep her place in the corps de ballet. She is a girl on the verge of womanhood, caught between the conflicting demands of life and art.

Musical numbers

Washington, D.C. 

Act 1
 "C'est le Ballet" – Adult Marie, Company 
 "Little Hole in the Wall" – Young Marie, Charlotte, Adult Marie 
 "Eye Examination" – Doctors 
 "Unfinished" – Degas, Mary Cassatt 
 "A Rat" – Rats, Adult Marie, Company 
 "Musicians and Dancers and Fools" – Christian 
 "Laundry" – Martine, Adult Marie, Antoinette, Young Marie, Charlotte, Laundresses 
 "Little Opportunities" – Antoinette, Company 
 "Petite Chanson" – Martine, Bar Patrons, Young Marie 
 "Ballerina" – Charlotte, Young Marie 
 "In Between" – Degas 
 "Act One Finale" – Degas, Adult Marie, Young Marie 

Act 2
 "Looking Back at Myself" – Adult Marie 
 "At the Dressing Table" – Antoinette, Martine, Young Marie 
 "Les Petites Danseuses" – Corbeil, Abonnes 
 "I'll Follow You" – Philippe 
 "Observations " – Mary Cassatt 
 "Little Opportunities (Reprise) " – Antoinette 
 "Moving Up in the World" – Martine, Laundresses, Adult Marie, Young Marie, Charlotte 
 "Dancing Still" – Christian 
 "A Box of Things" – Degas, Young Marie 
 "The Exposition" – Degas, Company 
 "What You Made of Me" – Adult Marie 
 "The Little Dancer Ballet " – Young Marie, Company 
 "Finale" – Company

Seattle, WA. 

Act 1
 "Prologue" – Young Marie
 "C'est le Ballet" – Adult Marie, Company 
 "Laundry" – Martine, Young Marie, Charlotte, Laundresses 
 "The Eye Examination" – Doctors 
 "Never Done Before" – Degas
 "A Rat" – Young Marie, Adult Marie, Company 
 "Musicians and Dancers and Fools" – Christian 
 "Little Opportunities" – Antoinette, Degas, Company 
 "Petite Chanson" – Martine, Le Rat Mort Patrons, Young Marie. Charlotte
 "The Audition" – Adult Marie
 "Marie" – Degas 
 "Act One Finale" – Degas, Adult Marie, Young Marie 

Act 2
 "Looking Back at Myself" – Adult Marie, Company 
 "At the Dressing Table" – Young Marie, Rats
 "Les Petites Danseuses" – Corbeil, Abonnes 
 "Observations " – Mary Cassatt 
 "Little Opportunities (Reprise) " – Antoinette 
 "Laundry (Reprise)" – Martine, Laundresses, Adult Marie
 "A Box of Things" – Degas, Young Marie 
 "The Life of the Person" – Degas
 "Between Us" – Christian, Young Marie 
 "The Exposition" – Degas, Company 
 "What You Made of Me" – Adult Marie 
 "The Choices: A Ballet " – Young Marie, Company 
 "Finale" – Company

Cast

Awards and honors

Original Washington, D.C. production (2014)

References

2014 musicals
American musicals
Cultural depictions of Edgar Degas
Dance in theatre
Musicals by Lynn Ahrens
Musicals by Stephen Flaherty
Musicals inspired by real-life events
Plays set in the 19th century
Plays set in France